The 1999 Italian Open was a tennis tournament played on outdoor clay courts. It was the 56th edition of the Italian Open, and was part of the ATP Super 9 of the 1999 ATP Tour, and of the Tier I Series of the 1999 WTA Tour. Both the men's and the women's events took place at the Foro Italico in Rome, Italy.

Seeds
Champion seeds are indicated in bold text while text in italics indicates the round in which those seeds were eliminated.

Draw

Finals

Top half

Bottom half

References

Italian Open
Italian Open (Tennis), 1999